Handover, in the political-historical sense, often refers to the transfer of power of former colonies (particularly those of former British colonies) to the local people. The term was also used for the transfer of the Panama Canal and the canal zone to Panama, and the returns of sovereignty to Iraq by the United States.
 The transfer of sovereignty of Hong Kong, a former British crown colony, from UK to People's Republic of China in 1997. After the handover, Hong Kong became a special administrative regions of China, a first-order division.
 The transfer of sovereignty of Macau from Portugal to People's Republic of China in 1999, with the region becoming a special administrative region.

Also the term (especially in the media) refers to the Olympic protocol during the closing ceremonies also known like Antwerp ceremonial when the mayor of the city that organized the Games returns the Olympic flag to the president of the International Olympic Committee, who then passes it on to the mayor of the next city to host the Olympic Games.

See also

Handover of Hong Kong
Handover of Macau
Handover of the Panama Canal
Handover of Iraq
Handover of Tacna

Political geography